The Province of Ljubljana was the central-southern area of Slovenia. In 1941, it was annexed by the Kingdom of Italy, and after 1943 occupied by Nazi Germany. Created on May 3, 1941, it was abolished on May 9, 1945, when the Slovene Partisans and partisans from other parts of Yugoslavia liberated it from the Nazi Operational Zone of the Adriatic Littoral. Its administrative centre was Ljubljana.

Background
During World War II, the Drava Banovina was in a unique situation. While Greece shared its experience of being trisected, this territory (roughly present-day Slovenia) experienced a further step—absorption and annexation into neighboring Nazi Germany, the Kingdom of Italy, and Hungary. After Yugoslavia was invaded by Axis Powers on 6 April 1941, Germany and Hungary occupied and annexed the northern part of the region. The ethnic German Gottscheers were moved out of the province because Hitler opposed having them in the Italian zone.

Territory
After the attack on Yugoslavia by Germany and Italy, the central area of Slovenia was occupied by Italy as a territory that had historically belonged to the County of Gorizia, the Duchy of Friuli, and the Ancient Roman provinces of Illyria, and the Roman city of Emona (modern Ljubljana) had been an important hub of communication.
The bulk of its territory was:
Lower Carniola (except a strip of land along the Sava River, occupied by the Third Reich);
The eastern portions of Inner Carniola (the present-day municipalities of Logatec, Cerknica, Bloke, and Loška Dolina),
The city of Ljubljana and its southern suburbs. The northern suburbs (Šentvid) were under the occupation of the Greater German Reich.

The Kingdom of Italy occupied Marindol and other villages that had previously belonged to the Banovina of Croatia, Milić-Selo, Paunović-Selo, Žunić-Selo, Vukobrati, Vidnjevići, and Vrhovci. These villages were annexed to the municipality of Črnomelj as part of the Province of Ljubljana, despite being predominantly inhabited by Orthodox Serbs.

After the war the inhabitants of those areas demanded to be returned to the People’s Republic of Croatia as part of the county of Karlovac. By the administrative organization of 1947, Marindol and the surrounding villages on the left bank of Kolpa constituted a local community in the composition of the county of Karlovac. It was still a constituent part of the county at the time of 1948 census. After that the complete area was under Slovene authority. Parts of the Žumberak/Gorjanci area were also annexed by Italy to the Ljubljana Province and parts of Gorski Kotar mainly in the Čabar area (villages around Prezid), all from what was earlier part of the Banovina of Croatia. This was an agreement between the Kingdom of Italy and the Independent State of Croatia on the border between the two Axis states during the Second World War.

Administration

The Italian period

Pre-resistance
Compared to the German policies in the northern Nazi-occupied area of Slovenia and the forced Fascist italianization in the former Austrian Littoral that was annexed after the First World War, the initial Italian policy in the central Slovenia was not as violent. Tens of thousands of Slovenes from German-occupied Lower Styria and Upper Carniola escaped to the Province of Ljubljana until June 1941.

The central area of Slovenia was first occupied by the Kingdom of Italy in April 1941. It was subjected to military occupation but in May 1941, after the debellatio of the Yugoslav State by the Axis Powers, it was formally annexed by the Kingdom of Italy under the name of Provincia di Lubiana. The province was created as a specific administration unit within Italy. Although considered as an integral part of Italy, it was treated as a corpus separatum. Unlike other provinces, it was administered by a High Commissioner, appointed by the Italian Government. The High Commissioner had a similar position as prefects in other Italian provinces, but was given wider competences. The first High Commissioner was Emilio Grazioli. The province did enjoy some political or administrative autonomy and several concessions were given to the local Slovene population. In the countryside, most of the municipal administrations, elected in general elections during the Kingdom of Yugoslavia, could continue to function. Judiciary and local administration personnel were also kept. Both Italian and Slovene were given the status of official languages and also the status of an administrative language. Most Slovenian cultural and educational institutions of national importance, such as the University of Ljubljana and the Academy of Sciences and Arts, were kept. Education in Slovene was kept, although Italian was introduced as an obligatory second language. The population of the Province was exempted from military service in the Italian Army.

Also, the Consult was created as an advisory council of the High Commissioner's office. It was composed by members of local economic and professional associations, as well as of those political party leaders that were willing to collaborate with Italian authorities.

Post-resistance and war crimes against the Slovene civil population

The initial tolerant policies of the Italian administration did not last long. After the establishment of the Liberation Front and the emergence of the partisan resistance, the Italian army's opinion has been in accord with the 1920s speech by Benito Mussolini:  
As noted by Minister of Foreign Affairs in Mussolini government, Galeazzo Ciano, when describing a meeting with secretary general of the National Fascist Party Aldo Vidussoni who wanted Italian army to kill all the Slovenes: 

General Mario Robotti, Commander of the Italian XI Corps (Italy) in Slovenia and Croatia, issued an order in line with a directive received from Mussolini in June 1942: "I would not be opposed to all (sic) Slovenes being imprisoned and replaced by Italians. In other words, we should take steps to ensure that political and ethnic frontiers coincide.", which qualifies as ethnic cleansing policy.

The Province of Ljubljana saw the deportation of 25,000 people, which equaled 7.5% of the total population. The operation, one of the most drastic in Europe, filled up Italian concentration camps on the island Rab, in Gonars, Monigo (Treviso), Renicci d'Anghiari, Chiesanuova and elsewhere.

Mario Roatta's "Circular 3C" (Circolare 3C), tantamount to a declaration of war on the Slovene civil population, involved him in war crimes while he was the commander of the 2nd Italian Army in Province of Ljubljana.

Italians put the barbed wire fence - which is now Trail of Remembrance and Comradeship - around Ljubljana in order to prevent communication between the Liberation Front in the city and the Partisan resistance in the surrounding countryside.

On February 25, 1942, only two days after the Italian Fascist regime established Gonars concentration camp the first transport of 5,343 internees (1,643 of whom were children) arrived from - at the time already overpopulated - Rab concentration camp, from the Province of Ljubljana itself and from another Italian concentration camp in Monigo (near Treviso). The survivors received no compensation from the Italian state after the war.

The violence against the Slovene civil population easily matched the German. For every major military operation, General M. Roatta issued additional special instructions, including one that the orders must be "carried out most energetically and without any false compassion".

One of Roatta's soldiers wrote home on July 1, 1942: "We have destroyed everything from top to bottom without sparing the innocent. We kill entire families every night, beating them to death or shooting them." The idea that Italian excesses in violence was due to anger or grief at the loss of comrades is false, since the process of killing and mass execution was a consequence of Fascist propaganda, de-humanizing the Slovenes as racially inferior.

After the war Roatta was on the list of the most sought after Italian war criminals indicted by Yugoslavia and other countries, but never saw anything like the Nuremberg Trials because the British government saw in Pietro Badoglio, also on the list, a guarantee of an anti-communist post-war Italy within the context of the Cold War. Some of the most notorious were put on trial however, including Roatta. But he escaped just before being jailed, and fled to Spain.

Structure 

The province was divided into five districts based around the pre-existing Yugoslav district boundaries, plus the city of Lubiana. Each district was further sub-divided into municipalities. The five districts were:
 Lubiana (28 municipalities)
 Longatico (11 municipalities)
 Novo Mesto (31 municipalities)
 Cernomegli (11 municipalities)
 Cocevie (13 municipalities)

The German period (1943–1945)
After the Italian armistice in September 1943, the province was occupied by Nazi Germany. The province was kept in the same borders that were set by Italian occupation forces. The province was included in the Adriatic Littoral. It was finally abolished on May 9, 1945.

Administration
During the Italian period (1941–1943), the province was ruled by a High Commissioner; for most of its history this post was held by Emilio Grazioli, replaced in early 1943 by Giuseppe Lombrassa who after the fall of Fascism was in turn replaced by General Riccardo Moizo, who only held the post for a month before the Armistice of Cassibile. In the first months after the province was officially annexed to Italy (May 1941), a so-called Consultation Council (consulta) was set up from high-ranking members of local economic, professional and political elites. The first chairman of the council was Marko Natlačen, former Yugoslav governor of the Drava Banovina. Already in 1942, he stepped down in opposition to Italian occupation policies, and the Council itself ceased to be summoned.

After the German occupation in September 1943, Leon Rupnik was named president of the province. He managed to establish a fairly autonomous provincial administration with the help of a small circle of collaborators.

Armed formations
In 1942 so called village guards started appearing spontaneously, as a self-defense against partisan revolutionary violence. They turned to Italians for weapons and equipment, and the Italians soon organized them as a part of Anti-Communist Volunteer Militia. They were called White Guard by the partisans (and even Germans later on).

After the capitulation of Italy most of the Slovene Chetniks were destroyed in the Battle of Grcarice (quietly helped by the Partisans, who then became the only resistance group in Slovenia) and members of the 'White Guard' were killed, captured, dispersed or fled to the Germans, where they formed the core of the newly established Slovenian Home Guard corps led by former general of the Royal Yugoslav Army Leon Rupnik. He became chief of the puppet provincial government of Ljubljana Province and came into the service of the Third Reich. Many previously captured or dispersed members of the White Guard soon joined the Slovenian Home Guard.

While the war was still going on some of the leaders of the 'White Guard' underwent a military court-martial in Kočevje and were sentenced to death. The trial was organized by the Slovenian National Liberation Council.

On the Allied side there was the Liberation Front of the Slovenian People which was formed on 27 April 1941 by the decision of the Central Committee of the Communist Party of Slovenia, which refrained from active participation in the fighting as the Communist line at the time was that both sides were engaged in an 'imperialist' war. Originally, organizations from the entire political spectrum participated, but as the influence of the Communist Party within the Liberation Front started to grow, some of them turned against it.

Ending
The area of the Province of Ljubljana after the Second World War were united with the rest of Slovene Lands that were under the control of Tito’s Yugoslavia and formed the People’s Republic of Slovenia in 1947 that was in the meantime called the Federal State of Slovenia (short form: Federal Slovenia).

Some of its territory was returned to Croatia but some was subsequently claimed by Slovenia.

The bulk of its territory is now the Republic of Slovenia.

See also
Liberation Front of the Slovenian People
Anti-Communist Volunteer Militia

References

Further reading
 Ballinger, P. (2002). History in exile: memory and identity at the borders of the Balkans. Princeton University Press, 
 Burgwyn, H.J. (2005). Empire on the Adriatic: Mussolini's Conquest of Yugoslavia 1941-1943 (introduction by Lutz Klinkhammer), Enigma Books, 
 Guerrazzi, Amedeo Osti  (2013): 'The Italian Army in Slovenia. Strategies of antipartisan Repression, 1941-1943', New York, Palgrave Macmillan
 Giuseppe Piemontese (1946): Twenty-nine months of Italian occupation of the Province of Ljubljana

States and territories established in 1941
States and territories disestablished in 1945
Former states and territories in Slovenia
Yugoslavia in World War II
World War II occupied territories
Former countries in the Balkans
Client states of Nazi Germany
Client states of Fascist Italy
Corpus separatum
Italy–Yugoslavia relations
1941 establishments in Europe
1945 disestablishments in Europe